Julius W. Harris (August 17, 1923 – October 17, 2004) was an American actor who appeared in more than 70 movies and numerous television series in a career that spanned four decades. Harris is best known for his roles in 1970s films such as Live and Let Die and the blaxploitation films Super Fly, Black Caesar and Hell Up in Harlem.

Early life and career
Born in Philadelphia, Pennsylvania to a dancer mother and musician father, Harris worked as a nurse, and a bouncer in New York City jazz clubs. Before he began his acting career, Harris served as a medic in the United States Army during World War II. After hanging out with many struggling actors, he took a dare and auditioned for his first role and was cast as the father in Nothing But a Man, a critically acclaimed 1964 film about black life in the South starring Ivan Dixon and Abbey Lincoln.

Some of his most prominent roles included the villainous, steel-armed Tee Hee in the James Bond film Live and Let Die, Scatter in Super Fly, Bubbletop Woodson in Let's Do It Again, Captain Bollin in Shaft's Big Score, Inspector Daniels in The Taking of Pelham One Two Three, Joseph in Islands in the Stream and Ugandan President Idi Amin in the TV movie Victory at Entebbe.

He also appeared in Trouble Man, King Kong, Black Caesar, Hell Up in Harlem, Friday Foster, Shrunken Heads, Harley Davidson and the Marlboro Man and in guest-starring roles on Sanford and Son, Good Times, and Love Boat among others. Harris was a member of the Negro Ensemble Company in New York City and appeared on Broadway in the Pulitzer Prize-winning play, No Place to Be Somebody.

Death
On October 17, 2004, Harris died of heart failure while admitted at Motion Picture and Television Hospital, aged 81. Harris was cremated and interred in Philadelphia, his place of birth. At the time of his death, Harris was survived by his two children; his daughter Kimberly and his son Gideon.

Filmography

References

External links

 
 

1923 births
2004 deaths
Male actors from Philadelphia
United States Army personnel of World War II
African-American male actors
American male film actors
American male stage actors
American male television actors
20th-century American male actors
20th-century African-American people
21st-century African-American people